ABM Ghulam Mostafa (2 February 1934 – 3 December 2022) was a Bangladeshi businessman and politician who served as a Member of Parliament from Comilla-4.

Early life
Mostafa was born on 2 February 1934 in Comilla, Bengal Presidency, British Raj. His father, Mafizuddin Ahmad, was the Minister of Education. He completed his bachelor's degree and Masters in Economics from the University of Dhaka in 1954 and 1955.

Career
Mostafa completed the Pakistan Civil Service examination in 1956. He served at a number of posts in the civil service of Pakistan. He was a member of the first Pay Commission of Bangladesh. He served as the Minister of Energy and Natural Resources and the Minister of Flood Control and Water Resource in 1988. He was elected to Parliament from Comilla-4 as a candidate of Bangladesh Awami League.
He was Chairman of AFC group and Shakti Aushadhaloy.

Death
Mostafa died on 3 December 2022, at the age of 88.

References

1934 births
2022 deaths
9th Jatiya Sangsad members
Awami League politicians
People from Comilla District
University of Dhaka alumni